1503 papal conclave may refer to:

 September 1503 papal conclave, which elected Pius III to succeed Alexander VI
 October 1503 papal conclave, which elected Julius II to succeed Pius III